This is a list of notable past and present residents of the U.S. city of Steubenville, Ohio, and its surrounding metropolitan area.

Arts

 Eliphalet Frazer Andrews (1835-1915) – painter
 Thomas Cole (1801-1848) – artist, oil painter, founder of the Hudson River School of landscape painting
 Alexander Doyle (1857-1922) – sculptor
 Eugene Louis Faccuito (born 1925) – jazz dancer and teacher, choreographer
 Albert Newsam (1809-1864)  – artist

Athletics

 Danny Abramowicz (born 1945) – former NFL wide receiver
 Chinedu Achebe (born 1977) – Arena Football League linebacker
 Johnny Bates (1882-1949) – former MLB outfielder
 Zinn Beck (1885-1981) – former MLB infielder
 Ray Bracken (1891-1974) – Olympic gold medal-winning sport shooter
 Zach Collaros (born 1988) – CFL quarterback
 Chip Coulter (born 1945) – former MLB infielder
 Sylvia Crawley (born 1972) – former ABL forward, women's basketball head coach
 Audrey Deemer (1930-2012) – All-American Girls Professional Baseball League player
 Rich Donnelly (born 1946) – former MLB coach
 Rollie Fingers (born 1946) – former MLB pitcher, National Baseball Hall of Famer
 Tom "Knute" Franckhauser (1937-1997) – former NFL cornerback
 Joe Gilliam, Sr. (c. 1923–2012) – Tennessee Sports Hall of Famer, former college football quarterback and coach
 Mike Gulan (born 1970) – former MLB infielder
 Paul Hoover (baseball) (born 1976) – former MLB player and current field coordinator for the Tampa Bay Rays 
 Jim Hudson (1943-2013) – former NFL and AFL safety
 Tony Jeter (born 1944) – former NFL tight end
 Cal Jones (1933-1956) – All-American football player at Iowa in College Football Hall of Fame
 Don Joyce (1929-2012) – former NFL and AFL defensive end, wrestler
 George Kaiserling (1893-1918) – FL and MLB pitcher 
 Eddie Kazak (1920-1999) – former MLB infielder
 Chuck Mather (1915-2006) – Kansas football head coach, Chicago Bears assistant coach
 Najee Murray - Defensive Back, Kent State 2013 - 2016 All-Mac | Current Defensive Back for Montreal Alouettes Canadian Football League
 Tom Needham (1879-1926) – former MLB catcher
 Tom Perko (born 1954) – former NFL linebacker
 Wally Pesuit (born 1954) – former NFL and USFL offensive and defensive lineman
 Eric Piatkowski (born 1970) – former NBA forward
 Adam Riggs (born 1972) – former MLB and Japanese Central League infielder
 Will Robinson (1911-2008) – first African-American head coach at a Division I school
 Chaz Roe (born 1986) – MLB Pitcher
 Gene Trosch (born 1945) – former AFL defensive lineman
 Moses Fleetwood Walker (1856-1924) – first African-American MLB player
 Weldy Walker (1860-1937) – second African-American MLB player
 Johnny Wilson (1915-2002) – former NFL tight end
 Quincy Wilson (born 1981) – former NFL running back
 Bobby Joe Young (born 1959) – former welterweight boxer

Business

 Dard Hunter (1883-1966) – papermaker, authority on printing

Literature

 Richard C. Banks (born 1931) – ornithologist, writer
 Bob Borden (born 1969) – writer
 Richard Hague (born 1947) – poet and novelist
 Jeffrey Hatcher – playwright, screenwriter
 Tad Mosel (1922-2008) – Pulitzer Prize-winning playwright
 Mary Tappan Wright (1851-1916) – novelist

Military

 John S. Mason (1824-1897) – Union Army general during the Civil War, Indian fighter
 Anson G. McCook (1835-1917) – Union Army general during the Civil War, U.S. Congressman
 Daniel McCook, Jr. (1834-1864) – Union Army general during the Civil War
 Edward M. McCook (1833-1909) – Union Army general, U.S. Minister to the Kingdom of Hawaii (1866-1868)
 George Wythe McCook (1821-1877) – Union Army general, Ohio attorney general
 Henry Christopher McCook (1837-1911) – Union Army chaplain and officer, minister
 John James McCook (1806 1865) – patriarch of the "Fighting McCooks" U.S. Army family, physician
 Robert Latimer McCook (1827-1862) – Union Army general
 Cas Myslinski (1920-1993) – USAF officer, athletic director of The University of Pittsburgh (1968-1982)
 Mele "Mel" Vojvodich (1929-2003) – USAF major general

Movies, television, and media

 John Buccigross (born 1966) – ESPN sportscaster
 Traci Lords (born 1968) – adult film actress
 Al Mancini (1932-2007) – actor
 Dean Martin (1917-1995) – singer, actor, entertainer. His daughter, Deana Martin, and her husband John Griffith, established the Dean Martin Festival in Steubenville. It is held annually in mid-June. Gail Martin, also a singer and another of Dean Martin's daughters, was born in Steubenville. 
 Will McMillan (1944-2015) – film and TV actor
 Tad Mosel (1922-2008) – playwright and screenwriter
 Jon Nese – meteorologist, TV weather channel personality
 Charles Stanton Ogle (1865-1940) – actor
 John Scarne (1903-1985) – magician, authority and writer on card manipulation
 Jimmy "The Greek" Snyder (1918-1996) – bookmaker, sports commentator

Music

 4th Disciple, a.k.a. El-Divine Amir Bey – record producer
 Ed Crawford, a.k.a. ed fROMOHIO (born 1964) – musician, guitarist
 Paul Howard (1895-1980)  – musician, bandleader
 Kinetic 9, a.k.a. Beretta 9 – musician, rapper 
 Robert Porco – choral conductor
 Rza (born 1969) – musician, rapper, music producer
 Dorothy Sloop (1913-1998) – jazz musician, pianist
 The Stereos (formed c. 1955-disbanded c. 1968) – doo-wop/pop group
 Patricia Welch (born 1954) – singer
 Wild Cherry (formed 1970-disbanded 1979) – funk rock band

Politics

 Douglas Applegate (born 1928) – former member of the U.S. House of Representatives (1977-1995)
 Ed Buck (born 1954) – Democrat political activist, convicted murderer, and fundraiser
 Jacob Pitzer Cowan (1823-1895) – member of the U.S. House of Representatives (1875-1877)
 Joseph S. Fowler (1820-1902) – United States Senator (1866-1871)
 John M. Goodenow (1782-1838) – former member of the U.S. House of Representatives (1829-1830)
 Robert H. Hatton (1826-1862) – United States Congressman, confederate during the Civil War
 Joseph P. Hoge (1810-1891) – former member of the U.S. House of Representatives (1843-1847)
 Daniel Parkhurst Leadbetter (1797-1870) – former member of the U.S. House of Representatives (1837–1841)
 Humphrey H. Leavitt (1796-1873) – former member of the U.S. House of Representatives (1830-1833, 1833–1834), United States district court judge
 William C. McCauslen (1796-1863) – former member of the U.S. House of Representatives (1843-1845)
 Anson G. McCook (1835-1917) – Union Army general, former member of the U.S. House of Representatives (1877–1883)
 B. Frank Murphy (1867-1938) – former member of the U.S. House of Representatives (1919-1933)
 Rees G. Richards (1842-1917) – politician
 Edwin M. Stanton (1814-1869) – lawyer, Secretary of War (1862-1868)
 Samuel Stokely (1796-1861) – former member of the U.S. House of Representatives (1841-1843)
 Andrew Stuart (1823-1872) – former member of the U.S. House of Representatives (1853–1855)
 Henry Swearingen (c. 1792–1849) – former member of the U.S. House of Representatives (1838-1841)
 Benjamin Tappan (1773-1857) – founder of the city of Ravenna, Ohio, U.S. Senator (1839-1845)
 Edward Vincent (1934-2012) – politician
 Joseph Ruggles Wilson (1822-1903) - theologian, father of President Woodrow Wilson
 Thomas Stokeley Wilson (1813-1894) – jurist and judge, legislator
 Jack Yost (born 1945) – politician

Religion

 Charles Clinton Beatty (1800-1882) – Presbyterian minister, founder of Steubenville Female Seminary
 Daniel DiNardo (born 1949) – Roman Catholic Cardinal, Archbishop of Galveston-Houston
 Roger Joseph Foys (born 1945) – 10th bishop of Covington
 John McDowell Leavitt (1824-1909) – lawyer, Episcopal priest
 Hlib Lonchyna (born 1954) – Bishop of the Ukrainian Catholic Eparchy of Holy Family of London
 Jeffrey Marc Monforton (born 1963) – fifth Bishop of Steubenville
 Stephen Return Riggs (1812-1883) – Christian missionary with the Dakota people, linguist
 David Stanton Tappan (1845-1922) – Presbyterian minister
 Edward F. Walker (1852-1918) – Minister, general superintendent in the Church of the Nazarene (1911-1918)
 Joseph Ruggles Wilson (1822-1903) – Presbyterian theologian; father of U.S. President Woodrow Wilson

Miscellaneous

 Dino Cellini (1914-1978) – mafioso, ran casinos for Meyer Lansky
 Charles Dillon Perrine (1867-1951) – astronomer
 Eli Todd Tappan (1824-1888) – educator
 Richard Timberlake (1922-2020) – professor of economics

References 

 
Steubenville, Ohio
Steubenville